Facklamia miroungae is a Gram-positive and facultatively anaerobic bacteria from the family of Facklamia which has been isolated from the nasal cavity of a southern elephant seal (Mirounga leonina).

References

External links
Type strain of Facklamia miroungae at BacDive -  the Bacterial Diversity Metadatabase

Bacteria described in 2001
Lactobacillales